The Stem Cell Network (SCN) is a Canadian non-profit that supports stem cell and regenerative medicine research, teaches the next generation of highly qualified personal, and delivers outreach activities across Canada. SCN has become Canada's foremost research organization dedicated to enable the translation of stem cell research into clinical applications, commercial products and public policy. The Network has been supported by the Government of Canada, since inception in 2001. This strategic funding, valued at $139M has benefitted approximately 231 world-class research groups and 5,000 trainees from across Canada. Additionally, SCN has catalyzed 25 clinical trials, 21 start-up companies, incubated several international and Canadian research networks and organizations, and established the Till & McCulloch Meetings, Canada's foremost stem cell research event.

The mission of the organization is "to capitalize upon Canada's competitive advantage in stem cells for the benefit of Canadians".

The organization is based in Ottawa, Ontario.

Activities

Annual Scientific Conference 
Since 2001, SCN has hosted an annual scientific conference. This conference is open to SCN investigators and trainees, and provides a forum to share new research. The conference takes place in a different Canadian city each year. In 2012, the annual conference was re-branded as the Till & McCulloch Meetings. The establishment of the Meetings ensured that the country's stem cell and regenerative medicine research community would continue to have a venue for collaboration and the sharing of important research. The Till & McCulloch Meetings are Canada's largest stem cell and regenerative medicine conference.

Research Funding Programs 
SCN has fostered the growth of a multi-disciplinary community of stem cell and regenerative medicine researchers with a strong history of collaboration. This community is one of SCNs’ greatest assets, enabling the development of an exciting and disruptive research program that is unlike any other in Canada. Since 2001, SCN has invested $139 million in research, training and outreach, and leveraged $148 million in partner support, benefitting more than 200 translational research projects and 231 world-class research groups.

Training 
The SCN training program includes studentships, fellowships, research grants and workshops. Since 2001, SCN has offered training opportunities to more than 5,000 trainees.

Organization

Member institutions 
SCN and its membership engage in collaborative funding and research activities. Current members institutions include:

Partners

References

External links 
 Stem Cell Network website
Till & McCulloch Meetings
 Networks of Centres of Excellence website

Medical and health organizations based in Ontario
Stem cell research